Chris Welsh (born 1955) is an American sportscaster and former baseball pitcher.

Chris Welsh may also refer to:
Christine Welsh (disambiguation)

See also
Chris Welch (born 1942), English music journalist
Chris Welch, American football coach
Chris Walsh (disambiguation)